Parafilimonas terrae is a Gram-negative and short rod-shaped bacterium from the genus of Parafilimonas which has been isolated from greenhouse soil from Yongjin-myeon in Korea.

References

Chitinophagia
Bacteria described in 2014